is a Japanese tokusatsu drama and the 40th entry of the Super Sentai franchise. The eponymous Zyuohgers, two humans and five anthropomorphic animals known as "Zyumans", protect the Earth from the evil Dethgaliens, who wish to use the planet as the venue for their latest Blood Game.

Main characters

Zyuohgers

The primary Zyuohgers are composed of four , humanoids with animal features from a pocket dimension called , and one human who fight together to defend Earth from the Dethgaliens. They also possess a  ability, which manifests certain features based on their associated animal when activated. The Zyuohgers later gain another human member who was originally captured and brainwashed to fight for the Dethgaliens, but joins their side after he breaks free from the villains' control with their help.

Yamato Kazakiri
 is a young zoologist with empathy for humans and animals alike.

Upon returning to Earth and learning of the Dethgaliens' attack, their Proofs transform into the Zyuoh Changers and allow them to fight back. However, the Link Cube is destroyed during the battle and the fledgling Zyuohgers discover they need six Champion's Proofs to fix it, but the sixth Proof has gone missing. Despite this, Yamato takes in the stranded Zyumans and continues to lead them in their fight against the Dethgaliens. Later in the series, Yamato goes on to discover Bud's connection to Kageyuki and why the latter was unable to see his mother before reconciling with his father.

Additionally, Yamato gained enhanced eyesight as a result of his becoming a Zyuohger and acquires additional powers and forms amidst his battles with the Dethgaliens, which are as follows:

In this form, he gains superhuman strength, the ability to produce powerful gusts from his nostrils, and perform the  finisher with the other Zyuohgers' energies.

During the final battle against Ginis, Yamato is empowered by the Earth's energy and gains the ability to activate a Great Wild Release similarly to his ally Misao Mondo and combine all of his forms' powers.

During the events of the film Doubutsu Sentai Zyuohger Returns: Give Me Your Life!

Sela
 is a competitive shark Zyuman with a sharp sense of hearing, disdain for showing weakness, and a rivalry with Leo for letting her win a duel in the past due to his weakness around women. Following the Dethgaliens' defeat and Earth and Zyuland's union, she goes on to work at a children's home for humans and Zyumans.

Leo
 is a calm yet foul-tempered lion Zyuman with a loud roar who is sensitive to his surroundings and considerate towards he considers weaker than himself. After the Dethgaliens' defeat, he reunites with his family and joins a band.

Tusk
 is an intelligent elephant Zyuman with a sharp sense of smell who comes from a wealthy family, displays a soft spot for Sela, and initially refuses to work with Yamato, believing the human stole his Champion's Proof until he learns of Yamato's past. Following the Dethgaliens' defeat, Tusk goes on to study at a university.

Amu
 is a mischievous yet shrewd white tiger Zyuman with a sharp sense of taste who is prone to helping those in need, easily influenced by trends, and displays an affinity for anything she considers pretty. Following the Dethgaliens' defeat, Amu finds work as a fashion model.

Misao Mondo
 is a human introvert who has had problems befriending others since childhood and is prone to becoming easily depressed when faced with criticism or failure. After being forcibly infused with the power of a Rhinoceros, Wolf and Crocodile Zyuman that the Dethgaliens captured, Mondo is transformed into a tri-colored artificial Zyuohger called  and tasked with stopping the Zyuohgers from interfering with their Blood Game. Following the Dethgaliens' defeat and Earth and Zyuland's merging, Mondo assists Larry in teaching humanity and Zyumans about each other's backgrounds and begins dating a rhinoceros Zyuman named Lilian.

Additionally, he wields the  sidearm, which has three modes that are each compatible with his own three forms. Moreover, as a result of the rhinoceros Zyuman's power, Mondo's sense of touch was enhanced to the point where he can detect danger through his fingertips and feel others' heartbeats by holding their hands.

: Mondo's black-colored default form that grants balanced physical capabilities.
: An alternate silver-colored that grants superhuman speed. In this form, he wields the Zyuoh The GunRod in its rifle-like , which allows him to perform the  finisher.
: An alternate gold-colored form that grants superhuman strength. In this form, he wields the Zyuoh The GunRod in its bō-like , which allows him to perform the  finisher.

Zyuoh Cubes

 : One of Yamato's personal Zyuoh Cubes that can turn into an eagle. It can fire lasers from the turbine on its back and execute a flaming divebomb attack.
 : Sela's personal Zyuoh Cube that can turn into a shark. It has a bite attack and can fly and swim.
 : Leo's personal Zyuoh Cube that can turn into a lion. It can fire a lightning blast from its mouth, which it can also use to bite enemies.
 : Tusk's personal Zyuoh Cube that can turn into an elephant. Its trunk can shoot an energy beam and produce mist.
 : Amu's personal Zyuoh Cube that can turn into a white tiger. It is armed with an extra pair of claws on its back that can shoot boomerang-like energy blades at enemies.
 : One of Yamato's personal Zyuoh Cubes that can turn into a gorilla. It possesses incredible strength and is equipped with the right shoulder-mounted .
 : One of Mondo's personal Zyuoh Cubes that can turn into a crocodile. It is capable of swimming, firing an energy beam from its mouth, and biting small targets.
 : One of Mondo's personal Zyuoh Cubes that can turn into a wolf. It possesses incredible speed and agility and can fire a sonic beam while in its Cube Mode.
 : One of Mondo's personal Zyuoh Cubes which Ginis modified to resemble and function as a rhinoceros-like carrier truck for Cube Crocodile and Wolf. As such, it does not have a Cube Mode.
 : One of Yamato's personal Zyuoh Cubes that can turn into a sperm whale. It is capable of swimming and flying, can fire torpedoes, and transforming into a mecha form called  via . The KaiOh Spear can also shrink down for Yamato's use.

Zyuoh Cube Weapons
The  are smaller Zyuoh Cubes that possess a third  for the Zyuohgers' mecha to wield. Unlike the primary Zyuoh Cubes, the Cube Weapons are marked with an exclamation point (!).

 : A green  marked with a question mark (?) that can turn into an octopus and combine with Zyuoh King to form . This formation can fly, perform the  attack, and the  finisher.

Animal Combinations
The Zyuohgers can assemble three Zyuoh Cubes into larger mecha via . Furthermore, they can add two or more Zyuoh Cubes via . The Zyuohgers later gain the power to assemble a larger number of Zyuoh Cubes and their Zyuoh Cube Weapons into stronger mecha via .

: The Zyuohgers' first mecha which consists of Cube Eagle and two other Zyuoh Cubes in specific arrangements.
 Zyuoh King (1-2-3-4-5): A special arrangement consisting of Cubes Eagle, Shark, Lion, Elephant, and Tiger. This combination appears exclusively in the film Doubutsu Sentai Zyuohger the Movie: The Exciting Circus Panic.
 Zyuoh King (1-2-4): An alternate arrangement consisting of Cubes Eagle, Shark, and Elephant. This combination appears exclusively in the film Doubutsu Sentai Zyuohger vs. Ninninger the Movie: Super Sentai's Message from the Future.
 Zyuoh Wild (6-5-4): The primary arrangement consisting of Cubes Gorilla, Tiger, and Elephant.
 Zyuoh Wild (6-2-3): The secondary arrangement consisting of Cubes Gorilla, Shark, and Lion.
 : A special arrangement consisting of Cubes Gorilla, Tiger, Lion, Elephant, Kirin, and Mogura.
 Zyuoh Wild (6-5-3): An alternate arrangement composed of Cubes Gorilla, Tiger, and Lion. This combination appears exclusively in the film Doubutsu Sentai Zyuohger vs. Ninninger the Movie: Super Sentai's Message from the Future.
 : Zyuoh The World's personal giant robot and the combined form of Cubes Crocodile, Wolf, and Rhinos that can perform the  finisher.
: A special mecha consisting of Cubes Condor, Tiger, and Elephant that can perform the  finisher. This combination appears exclusively in the films Doubutsu Sentai Zyuohger the Movie: The Exciting Circus Panic! and Doubutsu Sentai Zyuohger Returns: Give Me Your Life! Earth Champion Tournament.
: The Zyuohgers' first super giant robot consisting of Cubes Eagle, Shark, Lion, Elephant, Tiger, Gorilla, Kirin, and Mogura. Like Zyuoh King, this formation wields the King Sword. Additionally, it can perform the  finisher.
: The Zyuohgers' second super giant robot consisting of Cubes Eagle, Shark, Lion, Elephant, Tiger, Gorilla, Crocodile, Wolf, Rhinos, Kirin, Mogura, Kuma, and Koumori. While fighting alongside the Gokaigers, the Zyuohgers are able to combine their power with that of their Super Sentai predecessors to perform the  finisher.
: A  consisting of Wild Tousai King and the Ninningers' Combination Nin Shuriken that is capable of performing the  attack and the  finisher. This combination appears exclusively in the film Doubutsu Sentai Zyuohger vs. Ninninger the Movie: Super Sentai's Message from the Future
: A  and the Zyuohgers' ultimate giant robot composed of Cubes Eagle, Shark, Lion, Elephant, Tiger, Gorilla, Crocodile, Wolf, Rhinos, Whale, Kirin, Mogura, Kuma, and Koumori. During their final battle against Ginis, the Zyuohgers infuse the energy of their Zyuoh Cubes with that of Earth's to perform the  finisher.

Recurring characters

Bud
 is a mysterious eagle Zyuman that the Zyuohgers initially referred to as  who holds his kind in contempt for their racism towards humanity, which led to him leaving Zyuland, destroying the Link Cube, and stealing the sixth Champion's Proof to sever the connection between the two worlds. While in the human world, Bud was attacked by humans, but rescued by Yamato's father, Kageyuki. In return, Bud rescued Yamato himself and granted the boy some of his Zyuman power despite shortening his lifespan. Using the Champion's Proof to assume a human disguise, Bud later modifies it into the  so he can transform into  to help the Zyuohgers in their fight against the Dethgaliens. Following the Dethgaliens' defeat, Earth and Zyuland being merged, and peaceful relations being established between the two worlds, Bud departs to travel abroad.

As the orange-colored , Zyuoh Bird, Bud wields his own version of the EagRiser which allows him to perform the  finisher and his own version of the Riser Spinning Slash. Additionally, he has a similar Wild Release ability as Yamato's, though he can also use his without transforming into Zyuoh Bird. Due to his weakened Zyuman power however, Bud strains himself whenever he transforms.

Dethgaliens
They choose Earth as the venue for their 100th Blood Game due to its apparent lack of defenses, only to encounter and eventually be disassembled by the Zyuohgers.

Ginis
 is a conglomerate of countless Moebas, the owner of the Dethgaliens, and host of the Blood Games who normally resides within the Sagittariark as he is dependent on its power supply. After choosing Earth and losing one of his Team Leaders, Jagged, to the Zyuohgers, Ginis offers his remaining Leaders, Quval and Azald, a special prize for eliminating them. Following multiple failed attempts, Ginis grows bored until Bangray arrives on Earth to hunt Cube Whale. The former tasks Naria with using Gift Custom to compete with Bangray and collect data on Cube Whale, but the Zyuohgers destroy the machine. Despite this, Ginis has Naria save its data, which he later uses to absorb Earth's energy and evolve into  to thwart Quval's attempt on his life. When the Zyuohgers kill Quval and Azald, Ginis decides to end the Blood Game himself by using his cells and the Sagittariark to destroy Earth. While the Zyuohgers destroy the starship, Ginis survives to implant his cells directly into Earth and challenge them to stop him before he destroys the planet. During their fight, he reveals the Blood Games were a means to prove himself as a superior life form, though the Zyuohgers discover his secret. A livid Ginis kills Naria for being nearby when this occurred and enlarges, only to be destroyed by Wild Tousai Dodeka King.

In his original form, Ginis can spawn silver Moeba Medals so his Players can summon Moebas to assist them and upgrade Moeba Medals into gold Continue Medals so his Players can be revived and enlarged. After evolving into Shin Ginis, he gains a pair of wings capable of firing lasers, a pair of swords generated from his arms, and the ability to fire a beam from his palm capable of enlarging Players.

Moebas
They also pilot pyramid-like  fighter crafts.

Gift
 is a powerful robotic war machine that Ginis created, but rarely uses in his Blood Games to avoid making the proceedings too one-sided. It is eventually destroyed by Wild Zyuoh King. Ginis later creates the upgraded  to protect the Sagittariark during his attempt to destroy Earth, though the Zyuohgers destroy them all.

Naria
 is Ginis' smithsonite-themed secretary who is usually tasked with bringing  to fallen Team Leaders and Players in order to revive and enlarge them. While helping enact Ginis' endgame however, she enlarges herself to protect the Sagittariark, but the Zyuohgers defeat her and cause her to revert to her original size. When she learns her master is composed of countless Moebas, which he had kept secret, she accepts him for what he is and resolves to continue serving him. However, he takes her compassion as an unacceptable insult and kills her.

In battle, she wields the  nunchaku, which can also be used as a gun. 

Gift Custom
Instead of being automated, this model is piloted by Naria. It is destroyed by DodekaiOh, but Naria escapes before then, taking with her a record of battle data that Ginis later uses to evolve into Shin Ginis.

Azald
 is a hot-tempered Boleite-themed Team Leader who enjoys making his victims suffer physically and employs Players who utilize brute force. Following this, Azald was found by Ginis, who reconstructed the latter into his current form. Initially watching the 100th Blood Game from the sidelines, Azald personally battles the Zyuohgers after they free Ginis' Extra Player, Misao Mondo, from the Dethgaliens' control. After Bud uses the Whale Change Gun to wound him, Azald regains his memories and full power as Azald Legacy, breaks off from the Dethgaliens, and attempts to destroy Earth. However, the Zyuohgers discover his weakness and eventually destroy him permanently.

In battle, Azald wields the  great sword, possesses a durable cuboid body, and is functionally immortal so long as his core remains intact. As Azald Legacy, he can destroy his surroundings with simple gestures.

Quval
 is a cautious bismuth-themed Team Leader who enjoys making his victims suffer mentally, employs Players who rely on strategy and deception, and is the sole survivor of a world the Dethgaliens destroyed, having joined them under false pretenses to seek revenge. While battling the Zyuohgers and pursuing his goal, Quval slices off Bangray's hand and attaches it to himself to make use of the latter's mental powers before mounting an attempt on Ginis' life. When Ginis thwarts this however, Quval returns to him and tries to earn his forgiveness by personally killing the Zyuohgers. Despite receiving five Continue Medals to enlarge himself and significantly increase his power, Quval is destroyed by Wild Tousai Dodeka King.

Players
The  are the Dethgaliens' video game genre and game-themed participants who cause mayhem to attract Ginis' attention on their Leader's behalf and each possess a Medal Slot on their bodies, which allow them to be revived and enlarged via a Continue Medal.

Team Azald
 : A shooter game-themed Player who wields the  halberd, which he can enlarge and create duplicates of. He is defeated by the Zyuohgers, enlarged by Naria, and destroyed by Zyuoh King.
 : A high speed shooting-themed Player who ends almost every sentence with "-de guns" and wields the  crossbow. He is defeated by the Zyuohgers, enlarged by Naria, and destroyed by Zyuoh King via the Kirin Bazooka.
He is defeated by the Zyuohgers, enlarged by Naria, and destroyed by Zyuoh King.
 : A racing game-themed Player who is armed with the  morning star and the  bell, which is capable of enraging targets. He is defeated by the Zyuohgers, enlarged by Naria, and destroyed by Zyuoh King and Wild.
He is defeated by the Zyuohgers, enlarged by Naria, and destroyed by Wild Zyuoh King via the Kuma Axe.
 : A bowling-themed Player who is armed with the bowling pin-like  clubs and possesses the ability to manipulate living organisms like bowling pins. He is defeated by the Zyuohgers, enlarged by Naria, and destroyed by Tousai Zyuoh.
He is defeated by Zyuoh Elephant and The World, enlarged by Naria, and destroyed by Tousai Zyuoh via the Koumori Boomerang.
 : A wargame-themed Player who is armed with the  turret on his right shoulder, which is capable of firing missiles. He is defeated by Zyuoh Shark, Lion, Elephant, and Tiger, enlarged by Naria, and destroyed by Wild Tousai King.
He is defeated by the Zyuohgers, enlarged by Naria, and destroyed by Wild Tousai King.
 : A music video game-themed Player. He is defeated by Zyuoh Whale, enlarged by Naria, and destroyed by Wild Tousai Dodeka King.
 : Twin jump rope-themed Players who are armed with  jump ropes and  daggers. They are defeated by Zyuoh Eagle and Bird, enlarged by Naria, and destroyed by Wild Tousai Dodeka King.
 : A fighting game-themed Player who possesses the  head and is armed with the  bokken. He is defeated by Zyuoh Whale, enlarged by Naria, and destroyed by Zyuoh King Octopus.
 : A drawing video game-themed Player and the final Player to participate in the Blood Games who is armed with the  paintbrush, which doubles as a rapier. He is defeated by Zyuoh Shark, Lion, Elephant, and Tiger, enlarged by Naria, and destroyed by Wild Tousai Dodeka King.

Team Quval
 : A fighting game-themed Player armed with the dual-bladed  axe. He is defeated by the Zyuohgers, enlarged by Naria, and destroyed by Zyuoh King via the Kirin Bazooka.
 : A caring game-themed Player who possesses the ability to produce sleeping pollen that causes endless dreams and is armed with the  watering pot, which can create a  shield. He is defeated by the Zyuohgers, enlarged by Naria, and destroyed by Zyuoh Wild via the Mogura Drill.
 : A text sim-themed, hat-like Player who possesses the seemingly indestructible , which is armed with the  rod. He is defeated by Zyuoh Elephant, enlarged by Naria, and destroyed by Wild Zyuoh King.
He is defeated by Zyuoh Shark, Lion, Elephant, and Tiger, enlarged by Naria, and destroyed by Wild Zyuoh King via the Kuma Axe.
He is defeated by Zyuoh Eagle and The World, enlarged by Naria, and destroyed by Wild Tousai King.
 : A photography simulation game-themed Player armed with the  camera on his right shoulder and wields the  man catcher. He is defeated by the Zyuohgers, enlarged by Naria, and destroyed by Wild Tousai King.
 : A morality game-themed Player who possesses a two-sided body called . He is defeated by Zyuoh Whale, enlarged by Naria, and destroyed by Wild Tousai King and DodekaiOh.
He is defeated by Zyuoh Whale, enlarged by Naria, and destroyed by Wild Tousai Dodeka King.

Team Jagged
 : The stibnite-themed Team Leader who is equipped with the left arm-mounted  and the first of the Dethgaliens to attack Earth and confront the Zyuohgers, only to be defeated by Yamato, enlarged by Naria, and killed by Zyuoh King.
He is defeated by the Zyuohgers, enlarged by Naria, and destroyed by Wild Zyuoh King via the Kuma Axe.
He is defeated by the Zyuohgers, enlarged by Naria, and destroyed by Wild Zyuoh King via the Kuma Axe.

Other members
He is defeated by the Zyuohgers, enlarged by Naria, and destroyed by Wild Zyuoh King via the Kuma Axe.

Mario Mori
 is Yamato Kazakiri's maternal uncle, the inspiration behind the latter becoming a zoologist, and the younger brother of Yamato's late mother Wakako who owns a workshop where he makes animal sculptures. Despite agreeing to house Yamato's Zyuman teammates, Mori remains unaware of his guests' true nature for most of the series until he learns their secret during one of their battles.

Larry
 is a gorilla Zyuman and anthropologist and an old friend of Bud's who became stranded in the human world after Bud severed the connection between Earth and Zyuland. Initially enjoying studying humans, Larry soon began to loathe them and shunned having to make contact with them until he meets Yamato Kazakiri, whose lack of fear for him renews Larry's admiration for humans. After Yamato is grievously wounded while fighting the Dethgaliens, Larry gives the former a significant portion of his Zyuman energy to save him, shortening his own lifespan in the process. Following the Dethgaliens' defeat and Earth and Zyuland being merged, Larry joins Misao Mondo in teaching humans and Zyumans each others' cultures.

"Rhino Man", "Crocodile Man", and "Wolf Man"
After the Zyuohgers free Mondo of the Dethgaliens' control, the three Zyumans haunt him before encouraging him to join the Zyuohgers in fighting the Dethgaliens, with the wise "Rhino Man" serving as an advisor to Mondo and an intermediary for the "Crocodile Man" and "Wolf Man", who behave like a manzai duo. Following the Dethgaliens' defeat and Earth and Zyuland being merged, the three Zyumans disappear.

Bangray
 is a  who travels the universe to hunt giant animals for fun. Upon arriving on Earth to seek out his 100th prey, Cube Whale, he battles the Zyuohgers and the Dethgaliens before briefly joining the latter. In the process, Bangray forms rivalries with Zyuohger leader Yamato Kazakiri, who is able to resist the hunter's mental powers, and Quval after discovering the latter's true reason for being with the Dethgaliens. Using Quval's memories, Bangray extorts his help in catching Cube Whale in exchange for an alliance to overthrow Quval's leader, Ginis. When both of their plots fail however, Quval betrays Bangray by slicing his forearm off and leaving him with a Continue Medal, which Bangray eats to enlarge himself before he is destroyed by Wild Tousai Dodeka King.

In battle, Bangray wields the anchor-like , which he later fuses with his right arm following Quval's betrayal.

Kageyuki Kazakiri
 is Yamato's father and a doctor who hardly spent time with his family, which Yamato resented him for. Fifteen years prior to the series, Kageyuki encountered an injured Bud while traveling to his dying wife, Wakako. Bearing no fear of the Zyuman and believing that all lives support each other, Kageyuki healed Bud, who repaid him by taking care of Yamato. However, this led to Kageyuki arriving to the hospital after Wakako died and Yamato's resentment towards him worsening. Despite this, Kageyuki bears no ill will towards his son, realizing it was the price of his actions.

Guest characters
 : An aspiring composer and guitarist who Leo befriended.
 : A revived fiddler crab monster from the terrorist organization Shocker who attracts the attention of Yamato, Sela and Leo, who initially mistake him for a Dethgalien before joining forces with Takeru Tenkūji to defeat him. After the Dethgaliens enlarge him, Siomaneking is destroyed by Zyuoh Wild.
 : The current heir to the Daitenkū-ji Buddhist temple and a ghost capable of transforming into . He encounters the Zyuohgers while fighting Siomaneking.
 : Yamato Kazakiri's mother, Kageyuki Kazakiri's wife, and Mario Mori's older sister.
 : A group of space pirates and the 35th Super Sentai consisting of Captain Marvelous, Joe Gibken, Luka Millfy, Don Dogoier, Ahim de Famille, and Gai Ikari. They come to Earth to claim the Great Champion's Proof, fighting the Zyuohgers and Bangray for possession of it before joining forces with the former to fight the latter.
 : A blue whale Zyuman from ancient times who was the founder and first king of Zyuland. In his youth, when the Zyuman race lived on Earth, Cetus fought Azald Legacy by himself to protect his fellow Zyumans. In response to this, the planet gave him the Whale Change Gun, which he used to transform into the first Zyuohger, Zyuoh Whale and drive the monster back into space. In the present, Captain Marvelous and the Zyuohgers discover the Great Champion's Proof, which eventually leads to Yamato acquiring the Whale Change Gun and becoming the new Zyuoh Whale.
 : A giant kraken-themed monster with the combined essence of all the Zangyack emperors' spirits that defeated the Gokaigers on the Zangyack homeworld before the events of Tokumei Sentai Go-Busters vs. Kaizoku Sentai Gokaiger: The Movie. Bangray makes a duplicate of Gokudos Gill after reading Gai Ikari's memory, but it is defeated by Wild Tousai King via the power of the Gokaigers' Ranger Keys.

Spin-off exclusive characters
Seeking to recreate the universe into a circus by destroying planets he deems unnecessary, he comes to Earth and steals a large number of Moeba Medals from the Dethgaliens. Following this, he creates a Zyuman circus to gather energy from children's sadness so he can destroy Earth, only to be foiled by the Zyuohgers.
: A young, orphaned condor Zyuman born on Earth who became a member of a traveling Zyuman circus and appears exclusively in the films Doubutsu Sentai Zyuohger the Movie: The Exciting Circus Panic! and Doubutsu Sentai Zyuohger Returns: Give Me Your Life! Earth Champion Tournament.
After Naria hires him to eliminate the Zyuohgers, Gillmarda disguises himself as an alien named  to deceive the Ninningers into doing the job for him and have them kill each other in the process. However, a descendant of the Ninningers travels back in time to avert their deaths and convince the two Sentai teams to join forces and defeat him. Gillmarda enlarges, but is killed by Wild Tousai Shuriken King.
: A casino game-themed space mafia leader and a former Dethgalien Player who wields the  sword and appears exclusively in the film Doubutsu Sentai Zyuohger Returns: Give Me Your Life! Earth Champion Tournament. After creating clones of Naria and the three Team Leaders to serve him, Daniro hosts a martial arts tournament called the Earth Champion Tournament ostensibly to find the planet's champion while secretly using the tournament and his ability to turn hi victims into gems to fuel gambling at his illegal casino. After the Zyuohgers discover his true intentions, they foil his plans and defeat him. Daniro enlarges, but is killed by Wild Tousai King via the Condor Saber.
: A Rhinoceros Zyuman who appears exclusively in the film Doubutsu Sentai Zyuohger Returns: Give Me Your Life! Earth Champion Tournament. After fighting Misao Mondo during the titular tournament, they enter a relationship. Lillian is voiced by

Notes

References

Doubutsu Sentai Zyuohger